Jiang Shuying (born 1 September 1986), also known as Maggie Jiang, is a Chinese actress. She was educated at Shanghai Theatre Academy and the University of East Anglia (MSc Media Economics, 2011).

Career
Jiang rose to fame for her role in the 2013 film So Young, which won her Asian Film Award for Best Newcomer. She then starred in the family drama  A Servant of Two Masters alongside Zhang Jiayi and Yan Ni, and won the Huading Awards for Best Supporting Actress.

In 2015, she starred in medical drama Grow Up and romantic comedy series My Best Ex Boy-friend.

In 2016, she starred in the romance drama To Be a Better Man alongside Sun Honglei. The series was highly popular during its run and positive reviews. Jiang received acclaim for her performance, and won the Best Screen Performance award at the iQiyi All-Star Carnival. The same year, she won the Best Supporting Actress award at the 3rd China Australia International Film Festival for her performance in the action film Call of Heroes.

In 2018, Jiang starred in modern romance dramas Memories of Love alongside Wallace Chung and Aaron Yan, and Mr. Right with Jin Dong.

In 2019, Jiang starred in the esports drama The King's Avatar. The same year, she featured in historical fantasy drama Novoland: Eagle Flag. Jiang ranked 43rd on Forbes China Celebrity 100 list.

In 2020, Jiang starred in modern romance drama Wait in Beijing with Li Yifeng, historical drama Held in the Lonely Castle, and female-centric modern drama Nothing But Thirty.

Filmography

Film

Television series

Discography

Awards and nominations

References

1986 births
Living people
Shanghai Theatre Academy alumni
Alumni of the University of East Anglia
21st-century Chinese actresses
Actresses from Shanghai
Chinese film actresses
Chinese television actresses
Best Newcomer Asian Film Award winners
Chinese expatriates in England